Vatica vinosa is a tree in the family Dipterocarpaceae, native to Borneo. The specific epithet vinosa means "grape-coloured", referring to the hairs covering various parts of the plant.

Description
The inflorescences bear cream flowers.

Distribution and habitat
Vatica vinosa is endemic to Borneo.

Conservation
Vatica vinosa has been assessed as near threatened on the IUCN Red List. It is threatened mainly by conversion of land for agriculture and plantations. It is also threatened by logging for its timber.

References

vinosa
Endemic flora of Borneo
Plants described in 1962